Don N. Morgan (born September 18, 1975) is a former American football defensive back who played for the Minnesota Vikings and the Arizona Cardinals of the National Football League (NFL). He played college football at University of Nevada, Reno.

Morgan's wife is Sandra Douglass Morgan who is president of the Las Vegas Raiders.

References 

1975 births
Living people
Players of American football from Stockton, California
American football defensive backs
Nevada Wolf Pack football players
Minnesota Vikings players
Arizona Cardinals players